Avon Riley (February 10, 1958 – July 2, 2020) was an American football linebacker in the National Football League. He was drafted by the Houston Oilers in the ninth round of the 1981 NFL Draft. He played college football at UCLA. Riley also played for the Pittsburgh Steelers.

He died on July 2, 2020, in Houston, Texas, at age 62.

References

1958 births
2020 deaths
Players of American football from Savannah, Georgia
American football linebackers
College of the Canyons Cougars football players
UCLA Bruins football players
Houston Oilers players
Pittsburgh Steelers players
National Football League replacement players